HMS Blackpool (J27)  was a British  that served in World War II. She was paid off and sold to the Royal Norwegian Navy in 1946.

History

Royal Navy

Second World War 
HMS Blackpool was ordered on 6 July 1939 from Harland and Wolff, and laid down at Govan shipyard, Glasgow on 19 September 1939. She was launched on 4 July 1940 and commissioned on 3 February 1941. She was named after the English coastal town Blackpool, and was the first vessel to carry that name.

Following her work-up, she served on escort and minesweeping duties in the English Channel for most of the war.

Post war duties 
Blackpool continued mine clearing duties near Plymouth until July 1946, when she was paid off to reserve status, and sold to the Royal Norwegian Navy later that year.

Royal Norwegian Navy 
Blackpool was purchased and renamed Tarna by the Royal Norwegian Navy, and remained on the active register of ships until being struck in May 1961.

References 

 

1940 ships
Bangor-class minesweepers of the Royal Navy